The 2014 Kansas Jayhawks football team represented the University of Kansas as a member of the Big 12 Conference during the 2014 NCAA Division I FBS football season. The Jayhawks were led by third-year head coach Charlie Weis for the first four games of the season and interim head coach Clint Bowen for final eight games. The team played their home games at Memorial Stadium. They finished the season with an overall record of 3–9 and mark of 1–8 in conference play, placing ninth place in the Big 12.

On September 28, after starting the year 2–2 and going only 6–22 in two-plus seasons, head coach Charlie Weis was fired. Linebackers coach Clint Bowen was named interim head coach for the remainder of the season.

Schedule

Coaching staff

Roster

References

Kansas
Kansas Jayhawks football seasons
Kansas Jayhawks football